A chicken nugget is a food product consisting of a small piece of deboned chicken meat that is breaded or battered, then deep-fried or baked. Invented in the 1950s, chicken nuggets have become a very popular fast food restaurant item, as well as widely sold frozen for home use.

History 
The chicken nugget was invented in the 1950s by Robert C. Baker, a food science professor at Cornell University, and published as unpatented academic work. This bite-sized piece of chicken, coated in batter and then deep fried, was called the "Chicken Crispie" by Baker and his associates. Two problems the meat industry was facing at the time were being able to clump ground meat without a skin and producing a batter coating that could be both deep fried and frozen without becoming detached. Baker's innovations solved these problems and made it possible to form chicken nuggets in any shape by first coating the meat in vinegar, salt, grains, and milk powder to make it hold together and then using an egg and grain based batter that could be fried as well as frozen.

Nutritional information 
Chicken nuggets are generally regarded as a fatty, unhealthy food. A study published in the American Journal of Medicine analyzed the composition of chicken nuggets from two American fast food chains. It found that less than half of the material was skeletal muscle, with fat occurring in an equal or greater proportion. Other components included epithelial tissue, bone, nervous tissue and connective tissue. The authors concluded that "Chicken nuggets are mostly fat, and their name is a misnomer."

Manufacturing 

The processing required for making chicken nuggets begins with deboning. The chicken is cut and shaped to the correct size. This is done either manually, or by a series of automatic blades, or by a process called grinding (a method of deboning in which the softer parts of the chicken carcass are forced through a mesh, leaving behind the more solid pieces, resulting in a meat paste. If used, this paste is then shaped before battering). The pieces are battered and breaded in a large cylindrical drum that rotates, evenly coating all of the pieces in the desired spices and breading. The pieces are then fried in oil until the batter has set and the outside reaches the desired color. Finally, the nuggets are packaged, frozen and stored for shipping. While specific ingredients and production methods may vary between manufacturers, the above practices hold true for most of the industry.

In popular culture
Chicken nuggets have been the subject of food challenges, social media phenomena, and many more forms of public notoriety. The dish has inspired gourmet restaurants, exercise routines, and even feature-length productions, including Cooties, a movie about a grade school child who eats a chicken nugget infected with a virus that turns prepubescent children into zombies. Thomas Welborn holds the world record for eating the most chicken nuggets in three minutes (746 grams, or approximately 42 chicken nuggets).

On Twitter, the most retweeted tweet of 2017 was made by Carter Wilkerson who asked Wendy's what it would take for them to offer him a year of free nuggets. The tweet generated over 3.5 million retweets.

It was unveiled at Kosherfest in Secaucus, New Jersey on October 29, 2013.

Vegan nuggets 

In recent years, chicken nuggets made without chicken and with plant-based ingredients have entered the market and are sold by major retailers as vegan chicken nuggets. They are made from ingredients that include pea protein, soy protein, textured vegetable protein, and wheat gluten. Companies such as Beyond Meat, Impossible Foods, Morningstar Farms, and Simulate sell vegan chicken nuggets. In 2019, McDonald's trialed vegan McNuggets made of chickpeas and potatoes in Norway. Swedish fast food restaurant Max Hamburgare offers a dish containing nuggets made of falafel. Quorn also supplies vegetarian chicken-like nuggets derived from fungus. In 2022, KFC began serving vegan chicken nuggets at its 4,000 U.S. locations.

In 2022, Michele Simon wrote in Forbes that there were more than 20 brands selling vegan chicken nuggets. In 2022, Avery Yale Kamila said in the Portland Press Herald that because young people are the most interested in vegan food, it was not surprising that "vegan foods associated with childhood, such as hot dogs and chicken nuggets, would be the first to partner with youth-oriented TV shows and movies." In 2021, Culture Map Dallas taste tested vegan chicken nuggets, and in 2022, Bon Appétit magazine taste tested vegan chicken nuggets.

See also 

 Among Us chicken nugget
 Chicken fingers
 Fried chicken

References

External links 

 

American chicken dishes
Convenience foods
Fast food
Deep fried foods